A world cup is a global sporting competition in which the participant entities – usually international teams or individuals representing their countries – compete for the title of world champion. The event most associated with the concept is the FIFA World Cup for association football, which is widely known simply as "the World Cup." However, there are a number of notable popular team sports competitions labeled "world cups", such as the ICC Cricket World Cup, Rugby World Cup, Rugby League World Cup, and the Hockey World Cup.

A world cup is generally, though not always, considered the premier competition in its sport, with the victor attaining the highest honour in that sport and able to lay claim to the title of their sport's best. However, in some sports the Olympic title carries at least as much prestige, while other sports such as diving and artistic gymnastics differentiate between their premier competitions, such as World Championships and Olympic Games, and their "World Cup", which is organised as a smaller scale but high-level showcase event with small elite fields.

Differences between world cup and world championships
Some sports governing bodies prefer the title "world championship" or a related term; some even organize both a world cup and a world championship with different rules. Usually, such competitions take one of two forms, a short periodic competition or a year-long series of meetings, but more frequently many sports have both  World Cup (usually consisting of multiple events in a season), and world championship (usually a single event). Some examples are in the following table.
 

A periodic world cup or world championship usually takes the form of a knockout tournament (possibly with an initial group stage). This is held over a number of days or weeks, with the entrants eventually being whittled down to two, and the tournament culminating in a world cup final. The winner(s) take the title of World Champion(s) and hold it until the next time the event is held (usually one, two, or four years later). This format is most common in team sports, as with the FIFA World Cup or the Cricket World Cup.

Season-long format
A contrasting concept, popular in individual sports, is a year-long competition with several meetings over its course. In this format, victory at an individual meeting  earns a number of points, and, usually, a number of positions below also score points inversely related to their position. Contestants accumulate a number of points over the course of the year (often "season") and their cumulative total after all meetings have been concluded determines the World Champion or, simply, World Cup winner. The winner is then considered the champion until the next World Cup.

See also
 List of world sports championships, including those styled as "World Cups"
 World Cup (disambiguation)
 World Series (disambiguation)

References

Sports terminology